Hugh Stuart Fullerton III (10 September 1873 – 27 December 1945) was an American sportswriter in the first half of the 20th century. He was one of the founders of the Baseball Writers' Association of America. He is best remembered for his role in uncovering the 1919 "Black Sox" Scandal. Studs Terkel played Fullerton in the 1988 film Eight Men Out.

Biography
Fullerton was born in Ohio and attended the Ohio State University. Fullerton reportedly never graduated from Ohio State. He was kicked out for unknown reasons (he never explained to his family). He was later honored by the university for his writing. After starting in Cincinnati, he moved to Chicago to continue his career in journalism. Fullerton wrote in a colorful style, including slang and human interest elements for the first time in sports journalism. In fact, he is credited as the first writer to include quotes from players in sports coverage. Among his protégés were Ring Lardner and Grantland Rice.

Fullerton, however, was also adept at the details of the game of baseball, and made strong use of the predictive power of baseball statistics. He made a name for himself by predicting that the weak-hitting Chicago White Sox would upset the crosstown-rival Chicago Cubs in 1906 World Series; Fullerton rightly prognosticated that the White Sox would win Games 1 and 3, that the Cubs would win Game 2 and that it would rain on the fourth day. The Cubs had won 116 games that season and were favored to win; the White Sox had batted an anemic .230 with only seven home runs. The White Sox won the Series, four games to two.

Fullerton subsequently used the data he collected to correctly predict the winners of the 1912, 1915, 1916 and 1917 World Series.

Black Sox Scandal
Fullerton's prestige made him a powerful voice blowing the whistle on the Black Sox Scandal. Prior to the 1919 World Series between the White Sox and the Cincinnati Reds, Fullerton received a tip from professional gamblers that Cincinnati was a lock to win. The scene immortalized in the 1988 film Eight Men Out indicated that Fullerton (portrayed by Studs Terkel) watched the series with Ring Lardner (played by director John Sayles) and together they counted suspicious plays. In actuality, Fullerton did this with former pitching great Christy Mathewson. Fullerton's article for The Evening World, headlined "Is Big League Baseball Being Run for Gamblers, with Players in the Deal?", forced the baseball establishment to investigate the charges. One year later, the eight White Sox ballplayers who participated in, or knew of, the plot to throw the series were banned from the game for life.

Personal life

Fullerton was also famous for writing stories about his hometown of Hillsboro, Ohio. He died on December 27, 1945, in Dunedin, Florida. Fullerton was posthumously awarded the J. G. Taylor Spink Award by the Baseball Hall of Fame in 1964.

Hugh Fullerton IV (also known as Hugh Fullerton Jr., 1904–1965) was a reporter and columnist for the Associated Press. Hugh Fullerton V was a newspaper owner in Ohio and Michigan, and later taught journalism.

Sources
 The Black Sox Scandal: An Account, 2010
 Hugh S. Fullerton Vividly Describes the Full Details of Great Baseball Scandal, The Atlanta Constitution, October 3, 1920
 Baseball On Trial: The Black Sox and the Thrown World Series, The New Republic, October 20, 1920
 Hugh S. Fullerton, the Black Sox Scandal, and the Ethical Impulse in Sports Writing
 Uncovering the Fix of the 1919 World Series: The Role of Hugh Fullerton, NINE: A Journal of Baseball History and Culture, Fall 2004

References

External links
 
 
 
 

1873 births
1945 deaths
BBWAA Career Excellence Award recipients
Chicago Tribune people
Ohio State University alumni
Sportswriters from Illinois
Sportswriters from Ohio
The Cincinnati Enquirer people
The Philadelphia Inquirer people
Writers from Chicago